The 2016–17 Murray State Racers men's basketball team represented Murray State University during the 2016–17 NCAA Division I men's basketball season. The Racers, led by second-year head coach Matt McMahon, played their home games at the CFSB Center in Murray, Kentucky as members of the West Division of the Ohio Valley Conference. They finished the season 16–17, 8–8 in OVC play to finish in third place in the West Division. As the No. 7 seed in the OVC tournament, they defeated Tennessee Tech and Morehead State before losing to UT Martin in the semifinals.

Previous season
The Racers finished the 2015–16 season 17–14, 10–6 in OVC play to finish in a tie for the West Division title. They defeated Eastern Illinois in the first round of the OVC tournament to advance to the quarterfinals where they lost to Morehead State.

Preseason 
In a vote of Ohio Valley Conference head men’s basketball coaches and sports information directors, Murray State was picked to win the West Division of the OVC. Bryce Jones was selected to the All-OVC Preseason Team.

Roster

Schedule and results

|-
!colspan=9 style=| Exhibition

|-
!colspan=9 style=| Non-conference regular season

|-
!colspan=9 style=| Ohio Valley Conference regular season

|-
!colspan=9 style=|Ohio Valley Conference tournament

References

Murray State Racers men's basketball seasons
Murray State
Murray State
Murray State